Theresa Maxis Duchemin, IHM (born Almeide Maxis Duchemin 1810-1892) was a Black Catholic missionary in the United States, and the first US-born African American to become a religious sister.

She helped found both the Oblate Sisters of Providence—the first order of Black nuns in the US—and the Sisters, Servants of the Immaculate Heart of Mary. The latter was the first predominantly White order founded by an African-American, and Duchemin served as one of the earliest Black mother superiors in the nation. She opened multiple schools and orphanages in the Michigan and the Pennsylvania area and, was inducted into the Michigan Women's Hall of Fame. However, the IHM sisters, which she founded, only began to acknowledge her again in 1992—after a 160-year drought.

Biography  
Duchemin was born in 1810 to immigrant parents in Baltimore. Her father later left her family, and Duchemin was raised by her Haitian mother.

At the age of nineteen, she was involved in founding Oblate Sisters of Providence, which was the first Roman Catholic religious institute begun for Catholic women of African descent. Her mother, who was also involved with the Oblate Sisters died during an 1831 cholera epidemic in Baltimore. Duchemin subsequently moved to Michigan, to work in conjunction with Louis Florent Gillet. The two would found Servants of the Immaculate Heart of Mary, and later schools Michigan and, in 1858, expanding into Pennsylvania. 

Targeted by local bishops due to their racism and her Blackness, Duchemin was exiled multiple times and eventually moved in with Grey Nuns of the Sacred Heart in Canada, where she would spend much of the rest of her life, until returning to Michigan in 1885.

She died in 1892.

Historical suppression 
Due to racism, the IHM sisters scrubbed their records of Duchemin for 160 years, and presumably played a hand in Duchemin's 1893 biography going unpublished."[They] did not want to be associated with a black sister. It was "embarrassing" and "unpleasant," as sisters wrote in various letters. It would scare white people away from their ministries... before the 1980s, novices didn't even learn about Duchemin in formation... At one point, they even enlisted a cardinal to intervene in the publication of a book that might have outed them as having been co-founded by a black woman." In 1992, an IHM sister, Margaret Gannon, published letters acknowledging Duchemin and her significance; this began a period of collaboration between the IHM and Oblate sisters (the latter of whom had always acknowledged Duchemin as their own co-founder), as well as a more general acknowledgement of Duchemin within the IHM community.

References 

American Roman Catholic missionaries
Female Roman Catholic missionaries
1810 births
1892 deaths
African-American Catholics
African-American Roman Catholicism
African-American Catholic consecrated religious
African-American Roman Catholic religious sisters and nuns